MIFARE is the NXP Semiconductors-owned trademark of a series of integrated circuit (IC) chips used in contactless smart cards and proximity cards.

The brand name covers proprietary solutions based upon various levels of the ISO/IEC 14443 Type A 13.56 MHz contactless smart card standard.  It uses AES and DES/Triple-DES encryption standards, as well as an older proprietary encryption algorithm, Crypto-1. According to NXP, 10 billion of their smart card chips and over 150 million reader modules have been sold. MIFARE is owned by NXP Semiconductors, which was spun off from Philips Electronics in 2006.

Variants
MIFARE products are embedded in contactless and contact smart cards, smart paper tickets, wearables and phones.

The MIFARE brand name (derived from the term MIKRON FARE Collection and created by the company Mikron) covers four families of contactless cards:
 MIFARE Classic Employs a proprietary protocol compliant to parts 1–3 of ISO/IEC 14443 Type A, with an NXP proprietary security protocol for authentication and ciphering.  

Subtypes: MIFARE Classic EV1 (other subtypes are no longer in use).
 MIFARE Plus Drop-in replacement for MIFARE Classic with certified security level (AES-128 based) and is fully backward compatible with MIFARE Classic.

Subtypes: MIFARE Plus S, MIFARE Plus X, MIFARE Plus SE and MIFARE Plus EV2.
 MIFARE Ultralight Low-cost ICs that are useful for high volume applications such as public transport, loyalty cards and event ticketing.

Subtypes: MIFARE Ultralight C, MIFARE Ultralight EV1, MIFARE Ultralight Nano and MIFARE Ultralight AES.
 MIFARE DESFire Contactless ICs that comply with parts 3 and 4 of ISO/IEC 14443-4 Type A with a mask-ROM operating system from NXP. The DES in the name refers to the use of a DES, two-key 3DES, three-key 3DES and AES encryption; while Fire is an acronym for Fast, innovative, reliable, and enhanced.

Subtypes: MIFARE DESFire EV1, MIFARE DESFire EV2, MIFARE DESFire EV3 and MIFARE DESFire Light.

There is also the MIFARE SAM AV2 contact smart card. This can be used to handle the encryption in communicating with the contactless cards. The SAM (Secure Access Module) provides the secure storage of cryptographic keys and cryptographic functions.

MIFARE Classic family
The MIFARE Classic IC is just a memory storage device, where the memory is divided into segments and blocks with simple security mechanisms for access control. They are ASIC-based and have limited computational power. Due to their reliability and low cost, those cards are widely used for electronic wallets, access control, corporate ID cards, transportation or stadium ticketing. It uses an NXP proprietary security protocol (Crypto-1) for authentication and ciphering.

MIFARE Classic encryption has been compromised; see below for details.

The MIFARE Classic with 1K memory offers 1,024 bytes of data storage, split into 16 sectors; each sector is protected by two different keys, called A and B. Each key can be programmed to allow operations such as reading, writing, increasing value blocks, etc. MIFARE Classic with 4K memory offers 4,096 bytes split into forty sectors, of which 32 are the same size as in the 1K with eight more that are quadruple size sectors. MIFARE Classic Mini offers 320 bytes split into five sectors. For each of these IC types, 16 bytes per sector are reserved for the keys and access conditions and can not normally be used for user data. Also, the very first 16 bytes contain the serial number of the card and certain other manufacturer data and are read-only. That brings the net storage capacity of these cards down to 752 bytes for MIFARE Classic with 1K memory, 3,440 bytes for MIFARE Classic with 4K memory, and 224 bytes for MIFARE Mini.

The Samsung TecTile NFC tag stickers use MIFARE Classic chips. This means only devices with an NXP NFC controller chip can read or write these tags. At the moment BlackBerry phones, the Nokia Lumia 610 (August 2012), the Google Nexus 4, Google Nexus 7 LTE and Nexus 10 (October 2013) can't read/write TecTile stickers.

MIFARE Plus family

MIFARE Plus
MIFARE Plus is a replacement IC solution for the MIFARE Classic.

Key applications:
 Public transportation
 Access management; e.g., employee, school, or campus cards
 Electronic toll collection
 Car parking
 Loyalty programs

It is less flexible than a MIFARE DESFire EV1 contactless IC.

MIFARE Plus was publicly announced in March 2008 with first samples in Q1 2009.

MIFARE Plus, when used in older transportation systems that do not yet support AES on the reader side, still leaves an open door to attacks. Though it helps to mitigate threats from attacks that broke the Crypto-1 cipher through the weak random number generator, it does not help against brute force attacks and cryptoanalytic attacks.

During the transition period from MIFARE Classic to MIFARE Plus where only a few readers might support AES in the first place, it offers an optional AES authentication in Security Level 1 (which is in fact MIFARE Classic operation). This does not prevent the attacks mentioned above but enables a secure mutual authentication between the reader and the card to prove that the card belongs to the system and is not fake.

In its highest security level SL3, using 128-bit AES encryption, MIFARE Plus is secured from attacks.

MIFARE Plus EV1 
MIFARE Plus EV1 was announced in April 2016.

New features compared to MIFARE Plus X include:

 Sector-wise security-level switching The choice of crypto algorithm used in the authentication protocol can be set separately for each sector. This makes it possible to use the same card with both readers that can read MIFARE Classic products (with sectors protected by 48-bit CRYPTO1 keys, "Security Level 1") and readers that can read MIFARE Plus products (with sectors protected by 128-bit AES keys, "Security Level 3"). This feature is intended to make it easier to gradually migrate existing MIFARE Classic product-based installations to MIFARE Plus, without having to replace all readers at the same time.
 ISO 7816-4 wrapping The card can now be accessed in either the protocol for MIFARE (which is not compliant with the ISO 7816-4 APDU format), or using a new protocol variant that runs on top of ISO 7816-4. This way the cards become compatible with NFC reader APIs that can only exchange messages in ISO 7816-4 APDU format, with a maximum transfer data buffer size of 256 bytes.
 Proximity check While the protocol for MIFARE Classic tolerated message delays of several seconds, and was therefore vulnerable to relay attacks, MIFARE Plus EV1 now implements a basic "ISO compliant" distance-bounding protocol. This puts tighter timing constraints on the permitted round-trip delay during authentication, to make it harder to forward messages to far-away cards or readers via computer networks.
 Secure end-2-end channel Permits AES-protected over-the-air updates even to Crypto1 application sectors (SL1SL3 mix mode).
 Transaction MAC The card can produce an additional message-authentication code over a transaction that can be verified by a remote clearing service, independent of the keys used by the local reader during the transaction.

MIFARE Plus EV2 
The MIFARE Plus EV2 was introduced to the market on 23 June 2020. It comes with an enhanced read performance and transaction speed compared to MIFARE Plus EV1.

New features compared to MIFARE Plus EV1 include:
 Transaction Timer To help mitigate man-in-the-middle attacks, the Transaction Timer feature, which is also available on NXP’s MIFARE DESFire EV3 IC, makes it possible to set a maximum time per transaction, so it’s harder for an attacker to interfere with the transaction.

MIFARE Ultralight family

MIFARE Ultralight
The MIFARE Ultralight has only 512 bits of memory (i.e. 64 bytes), without cryptographic security. The memory is provided in 16 pages of 4 bytes.
Cards based on these chips are so inexpensive that they are often used for disposable tickets for events such as the Football World Cup 2006.
It provides only basic security features such as one-time-programmable (OTP) bits and a write-lock feature to prevent re-writing of memory pages but does not include cryptography as applied in other MIFARE product-based cards.

MIFARE Ultralight EV1
MIFARE Ultralight EV1 introduced in November 2012 the next generation of paper ticketing smart card ICs for limited-use applications for ticketing schemes and additional security options. It comes with several enhancements above the original MIFARE Ultralight:
 384 and 1024 bits user memory product variants
 OTP, lock bits, configurable counters for improved security
 Three independent 24-bit one-way counters to stop reloading
 Protected data access through 32-bit password
 NXP Semiconductors originality signature function, this is an integrated originality checker and is effective cloning protection that helps to prevent counterfeit of tickets. However, this protection is applicable only to "mass penetration of non NXP originated chips and does not prevent hardware copy or emulation of a single existing valid chip"

Applications:
 Limited-use tickets in public transport
 Event ticketing (stadiums, exhibitions, leisure parks)
 Loyalty

MIFARE Ultralight C
Introduced at the Cartes industry trade show in 2008, the MIFARE Ultralight C IC is part of NXP's low-cost MIFARE product offering (disposable ticket). With Triple DES, MIFARE Ultralight C uses a widely adopted standard, enabling easy integration in existing infrastructures. The integrated Triple DES authentication provides an effective countermeasure against cloning.

Key applications for MIFARE Ultralight C are public transportation, event ticketing, loyalty and NFC Forum tag type 2.

MIFARE Ultralight AES
It was introduced in 2022.

MIFARE DESFire family

MIFARE DESFire
The MIFARE DESFire (MF3ICD40) was introduced in 2002 and is based on a core similar to SmartMX, with more hardware and software security features than MIFARE Classic. It comes pre-programmed with the general-purpose MIFARE DESFire operating system which offers a simple directory structure and files. They are sold in four variants: One with Triple-DES only and 4 kiB of storage, and three with AES (2, 4, or 8 kiB; see MIFARE DESFire EV1). The AES variants have additional security features; e.g., CMAC. MIFARE DESFire uses a protocol compliant with ISO/IEC 14443-4. The contactless IC is based on an 8051 processor with 3DES/AES cryptographic accelerator, making very fast transactions possible.

In 2010, NXP announced the discontinuation of the MIFARE DESFire (MF3ICD40) after it had introduced its successor MIFARE DESFire EV1 (MF3ICD41) in late 2008. In October 2011 researchers of Ruhr University Bochum announced that they had broken the security of MIFARE DESFire (MF3ICD40), which was acknowledged by NXP (see MIFARE DESFire security).

MIFARE DESFire EV1
First evolution of MIFARE DESFire contactless IC, broadly backwards compatible. Available with 2 kiB, 4 kiB, and 8 kiB non-volatile memory. Other features include:
 Support for random ID.
 Support for 128-bit AES
 Hardware and operating system are Common Criteria certified at level EAL 4+

MIFARE DESFire EV1 was publicly announced in November 2006.

Key applications:
 Advanced public transportation
 Access management
 Loyalty
 Micropayment

MIFARE DESFire EV2

The second evolution of the MIFARE DESFire contactless IC family, broadly backwards compatible.
New features include:
 MIsmartApp enabling to offer or sell memory space for additional applications of 3rd parties without the need to share secret keys
 Transaction MAC to authenticate transactions by 3rd parties
 Virtual Card Architecture for privacy protection
 Proximity check against relay attacks

MIFARE DESFire EV2 was publicly announced in March 2016 at the IT-TRANS event in Karlsruhe, Germany

MIFARE DESFire EV3

The latest evolution of the MIFARE DESFire contactless IC family, broadly backward compatible.
New features include:

 ISO/IEC 14443 A 1–4 and ISO/IEC 7816-4 compliant
 Common Criteria EAL5+ certified for IC hardware and software
 NFC Forum Tag Type 4 compliant
 SUN message authentication for advanced data protection within standard NDEF read operation
 Choice of open DES/2K3DES/3K3DES/AES crypto algorithms
 Flexible file structure hosts as many applications as the memory size supports
 Proof of transaction with card generated MAC
 Transaction Timer mitigates risk of man-in-the-middle attacks

MIFARE DESFire EV3 was publicly announced on 2 June 2020.

MIFARE SAM AV2
MIFARE SAMs are not contactless smart cards. They are secure access modules designed to provide the secure storage of cryptographic keys and cryptographic functions for terminals to access the MIFARE products securely and to enable secure communication between terminals and host (backend). MIFARE SAMs are available from NXP in the contact-only module (PCM 1.1) as defined in ISO/IEC 7816-2 and the HVQFN32 format.

Integrating a MIFARE SAM AV2 in a contactless smart card reader enables a design that integrates high-end cryptography features and the support of cryptographic authentication and data encryption/decryption.  Like any SAM, it offers functionality to store keys securely and perform authentication and encryption of data between the contactless card and the SAM and the SAM towards the backend. Next to a classical SAM architecture, the MIFARE SAM AV2 supports the X-mode which allows a fast and convenient contactless terminal development by connecting the SAM to the microcontroller and reader IC simultaneously.

MIFARE SAM AV2 offers AV1 mode and AV2 mode where in comparison to the SAM AV1 the AV2 version includes public key infrastructure (PKI), hash functions like SHA-1, SHA-224, and SHA-256. It supports MIFARE Plus and secure host communication. Both modes provide the same communication interfaces, cryptographic algorithms (Triple-DES 112-bit and 168-bit key, MIFARE products using Crypto1, AES-128 and AES-192, RSA with up to 2048-bit keys), and X-mode functionalities. The MIFARE SAM AV3 is the third generation of NXP’s Secure Access Module, and it supports MIFARE ICs as well as NXP’s UCODE DNA, ICODE DNA and NTAG DNA ICs.

MIFARE 2GO 
A cloud-based platform that digitizes MIFARE product-based smart cards and makes them available on NFC-enabled smartphones and wearables. With this, new Smart City use cases such as mobile transit ticketing, mobile access and mobile micropayments are being enabled.

Applications
MIFARE products can be used in different applications:

 Automated fare collection system
 Identification cards
 Access management 
 Campus cards 
 Loyalty cards (reward points)
 Tourist cards
 Micropayment (mobile wallet, contactless payment, cashless payment)
 Road tolling
 Transport ticketing
 Event ticketing
 Mobile ticketing
 Citizen card
 Membership cards
 Parking
 Library cards
 Fuel cards
 Hotel key cards
 NFC Tag (NFC apps, MIFARE4Mobile)  
 Taxi cards
 Smart meter
 Museum access cards
 Product authentication
 Production control
 Health cards
 Ferry Cards
 Car rentals
 Fleet management
 Amusement parks
 Bike rentals
 Blood donor cards
 Information services
 Interactive exhibits
 Interactive lotteries
 Password storage
 Smart advertising
 Social welfare
 Waste management

Formerly most access systems used MIFARE Classic, but today these systems have switched to MIFARE DESFire because this product has more security than MIFARE Classic.

Byte layout

History
 1994 – MIFARE Classic IC with 1K user memory introduced.
 1996 – First transport scheme in Seoul using MIFARE Classic with 1K memory.
 1997 – MIFARE PRO with Triple DES coprocessor introduced.
 1999 – MIFARE PROX with PKI coprocessor introduced.
 2001 – MIFARE Ultralight introduced.
 2002 – MIFARE DESFire introduced, microprocessor based product.
 2004 – MIFARE SAM introduced, secure infrastructure counterpart of MIFARE DESFire.
 2006 – MIFARE DESFire EV1 is announced as the first product to support 128-bit AES.
 2008 – MIFARE4Mobile industry Group is created, consisting of leading players in the Near Field Communication (NFC) ecosystem.
 2008 – MIFARE Plus is announced as a drop-in replacement for MIFARE Classic based on 128-bit AES.
 2008 – MIFARE Ultralight C is introduced as a smart paper ticketing IC featuring Triple DES Authentication.
 2010 – MIFARE SAM AV2 is introduced as secure key storage for readers AES, Triple DES, PKI Authentication.
 2012 – MIFARE Ultralight EV1 introduced, backward compatible to MIFARE Ultralight but with extra security.
 2014 – MIFARE SDK was introduced, allowing developers to create and develop their own NFC Android applications. 
 2014 – NXP Smart MX2 the world's first secure smart card platform supporting MIFARE Plus and MIFARE DESFire EV1 with EAL 50 was released.
 2015 – MIFARE Plus SE, the entry-level version of NXP's proven and reliable MIFARE Plus product family, was introduced.
 2016 – MIFARE Plus EV1 was introduced, the proven mainstream smart card product compatible with MIFARE Classic in its backward compatible security level.
 2016 – MIFARE DESFire EV2 is announced with improved performance, security, privacy and multi-application support.
 2016 – MIFARE SDK is rebranded to TapLinx, with additional supported products.
 2018 – MIFARE 2GO cloud service was introduced, allows to manage MIFARE DESFire and MIFARE Plus (in SL3) product-based credentials onto NFC-enabled mobile and wearable devices.
2020 – MIFARE DESFire EV3 is announced
2020 – MIFARE Plus EV2 was introduced, adding SL3 to support MIFARE 2GO, EAL5+ certification & Transaction Timer to help mitigate man-in-the-middle attacks.
2022 – MIFARE Ultralight AES was introduced.

The MIFARE product portfolio was originally developed by Mikron in Gratkorn, Austria. Mikron was acquired by Philips in 1995. Mikron sourced silicon from Atmel in the US, Philips in the Netherlands, and Siemens in Germany.

Infineon Technologies (then Siemens) licensed MIFARE Classic from Mikron in 1994 and developed both stand alone and integrated designs with MIFARE product functions. Infineon currently produces various derivatives based on MIFARE Classic including 1K memory (SLE66R35) and various microcontrollers (8 bit (SLE66 series), 16 bit (SLE7x series), and 32 bit (SLE97 series) with MIFARE implementations, including devices for use in USIM with Near Field Communication.

Motorola tried to develop MIFARE product-like chips for the wired-logic version but finally gave up. The project expected one million cards per month for start, but that fell to 100,000 per month just before they gave up the project.

In 1998 Philips licensed MIFARE Classic to Hitachi Hitachi licensed MIFARE products for the development of the contactless smart card solution for NTT's IC telephone card which started in 1999 and finished in 2006. In the NTT contactless IC telephone card project, three parties joined: Tokin-Tamura-Siemens, Hitachi (Philips-contract for technical support), and Denso (Motorola-only production). NTT asked for two versions of chip, i.e. wired-logic chip (like MIFARE Classic) with small memory and big memory capacity. Hitachi developed only big memory version and cut part of the memory to fit for the small memory version.

The deal with Hitachi was upgraded in 2008 by NXP (by then no longer part of Philips) to include MIFARE Plus and MIFARE DESFire to the renamed semiconductor division of Hitachi Renesas Technology.

In 2010 NXP licensed MIFARE products to Gemalto. In 2011 NXP licensed Oberthur to use MIFARE products on SIM cards. In 2012 NXP signed an agreement with Giesecke & Devrient to integrate MIFARE product-based applications on their secure SIM products. These licensees are developing Near Field Communication products

Security

MIFARE Classic 
The encryption used by the MIFARE Classic IC uses a 48-bit key.

A presentation by Henryk Plötz and Karsten Nohl at the Chaos Communication Congress in December 2007 described a partial reverse-engineering of the algorithm used in the MIFARE Classic chip. Abstract and slides are available online. A paper that describes the process of reverse engineering this chip was published at the August 2008 USENIX security conference.

In March 2008 the Digital Security research group of the Radboud University Nijmegen made public that they performed a complete reverse-engineering and were able to clone and manipulate the contents of an OV-Chipkaart which is using MIFARE Classic chip. For demonstration they used the Proxmark3 device, a 125 kHz / 13.56 MHz research instrument. The schematics and software are released under the free GNU General Public License by Jonathan Westhues in 2007. They demonstrate it is even possible to perform card-only attacks using just an ordinary stock-commercial NFC reader in combination with the libnfc library.

The Radboud University published four scientific papers concerning the security of the MIFARE Classic:
 A Practical Attack on the MIFARE Classic
 Dismantling MIFARE Classic
 Wirelessly Pickpocketing a MIFARE Classic Card
 Ciphertext-only Cryptanalysis on Hardened MIFARE Classic Cards

In response to these attacks, the Dutch Minister of the Interior and Kingdom Relations stated that they would investigate whether the introduction of the Dutch Rijkspas could be brought forward from Q4 of 2008.

NXP tried to stop the publication of the second article by requesting a preliminary injunction. However, the injunction was denied, with the court noting that, "It should be considered that the publication of scientific studies carries a lot of weight in a democratic society, as does inform society about serious issues in the chip because it allows for mitigating of the risks."

Both independent research results are confirmed by the manufacturer NXP. These attacks on the cards didn't stop the further introduction of the card as the only accepted card for all Dutch public transport the OV-chipkaart continued as nothing happened but in October 2011 the company TLS, responsible for the OV-Chipkaart announced that the new version of the card will be better protected against fraud.

The MIFARE Classic encryption Crypto-1 can be broken in about 200 seconds on a laptop from 2008, if approx. 50 bits of known (or chosen) keystream are available. This attack reveals the key from sniffed transactions under certain (common) circumstances and/or allows an attacker to learn the key by challenging the reader device.

The attack proposed in recovers the secret key in about 40 ms on a laptop. This attack requires just one (partial) authentication attempt with a legitimate reader.

Additionally, there are a number of attacks that work directly on a card and without the help of a valid reader device. These attacks have been acknowledged by NXP. 
In April 2009 new and better card-only attack on MIFARE Classic has been found. It was first announced at the rump session of Eurocrypt 2009. 
This attack was presented at SECRYPT 2009. 
The full description of this latest and fastest attack to date can also be found in the IACR preprint archive. 
The new attack improves by a factor of more than 10 all previous card-only attacks on MIFARE Classic, has instant running time, and does not require a costly precomputation. The new attack allows recovering the secret key of any sector of the MIFARE Classic card via wireless interaction, within about 300 queries to the card. It can then be combined with the nested authentication attack in the Nijmegen Oakland paper to recover subsequent keys almost instantly. Both attacks combined and with the right hardware equipment such as Proxmark3, one should be able to clone any MIFARE Classic card in 10 seconds or less. This is much faster than previously thought.

In an attempt to counter these card-only attacks, new "hardened" cards have been released in and around 2011, such as the MIFARE Classic EV1. These variants are insusceptible for all card-only attacks publicly known until then, while remaining backward compatible with the original MIFARE Classic. In 2015, a new card-only attack was discovered that is also able to recover the secret keys from such hardened variants.
Since the discovery of this attack, NXP is officially recommending to migrate from MIFARE Classic product-based systems to higher security products.

MIFARE DESFire
In November 2010, security researchers from the Ruhr University released a paper detailing a side-channel attack against MIFARE product-based cards. The paper demonstrated that MIFARE DESFire product-based cards could be easily emulated at a cost of approximately $25 in "off the shelf" hardware. The authors asserted that this side-channel attack allowed cards to be cloned in approximately 100 ms. Furthermore, the paper's authors included hardware schematics for their original cloning device, and have since made corresponding software, firmware and improved hardware schematics publicly available on GitHub.

In October 2011 David Oswald and Christof Paar of Ruhr-University in Bochum, Germany, detailed how they were able to conduct a successful "side-channel" attack against the card using equipment that can be built for nearly $3,000. Called "Breaking MIFARE DESFire MF3ICD40: Power Analysis and Templates in the Real World", they stated that system integrators should be aware of the new security risks that arise from the presented attacks and can no longer rely on the mathematical security of the used 3DES cipher. Hence, to avoid, e.g. manipulation or cloning of smart cards used in payment or access control solutions, proper actions have to be taken: on the one hand, multi-level countermeasures in the back end allow to minimize the threat even if the underlying RFID platform is insecure," In a statement NXP said that the attack would be difficult to replicate and that they had already planned to discontinue the product at the end of 2011. NXP also stated "Also, the impact of a successful attack depends on the end-to-end system security design of each individual infrastructure and whether diversified keys – recommended by NXP – are being used. If this is the case, a stolen or lost card can be disabled simply by the operator detecting the fraud and blacklisting the card, however, this operation assumes that the operator has those mechanisms implemented. This will make it even harder to replicate the attack with a commercial purpose."

MIFARE Ultralight
In September 2012 a security consultancy Intrepidus demonstrated at the EU SecWest event in Amsterdam, that MIFARE Ultralight product-based fare cards in the New Jersey and San Francisco transit systems can be manipulated using an Android application, enabling travelers to reset their card balance and travel for free in a talk entitled "NFC For Free Rides and Rooms (on your phone)". Although not a direct attack on the chip but rather the reloading of an unprotected register on the device, it allows hackers to replace value and show that the card is valid for use. This can be overcome by having a copy of the register online so that values can be analysed and suspect cards hot-listed. NXP has responded by pointing out that they had introduced the MIFARE Ultralight C in 2008 with 3DES protection and in November 2012 introduced the MIFARE Ultralight EV1 with three decrement only counters to foil such reloading attacks.

Considerations for systems integration
For systems based on contactless smartcards (e.g. public transportation), security against fraud relies on many components, of which the card is just one. Typically, to minimize costs, systems integrators will choose a relatively cheap card such as a MIFARE Classic and concentrate security efforts in the back office. Additional encryption on the card, transaction counters, and other methods known in cryptography are then employed to make cloned cards useless, or at least to enable the back office to detect a fraudulent card, and put it on a blacklist. Systems that work with online readers only (i.e., readers with a permanent link to the back office) are easier to protect than systems that have offline readers as well, for which real-time checks are not possible and blacklists cannot be updated as frequently.

Certification
Another aspect of fraud prevention and compatibility guarantee is to obtain certification called to live in 1998 ensuring the compatibility of several certified MIFARE product-based cards with multiple readers. With this certification, the main focus was placed on the contactless communication of the wireless interface, as well as to ensure proper implementation of all the commands of MIFARE product-based cards. The certification process was developed and carried out by the Austrian laboratory called Arsenal Research. Today, independent test houses such as Arsenal Testhouse, UL and LSI-TEC, perform the certification tests and provide the certified products in an online database.

Places that use MIFARE products

Transportation

Application references

Institutions
 Northwest University, South Africa – Student/staff ID, access control, library, student meals, sport applications, payments
 Linkoping university, Sweden – Student/staff ID, access control, library, copy/print, student discount, payments
 London School of Economics  – Access control (Unprotected MIFARE Classic 1K)
 New College School in Oxford – Building access.
 Imperial College London – Staff and student ID access card in London, UK.
 Cambridge University – Student/Staff ID and access card, library card, canteen payments in some colleges
 University of Warwick – Staff and student ID card and separate Eating at Warwick stored value card in Coventry, UK.
 Regent's College, London – Staff and student ID access card in London, UK.
 University of New South Wales – Student ID access card.
 The University of Queensland – Staff and student ID, access control, library, copy/print, building access (MIFARE DESFire EV1)
 University of Alberta – Staff OneCard trial currently underway.
 Northumbria University – Student/staff building and printer access.
 City University of Hong Kong – Student/staff building, library, amenities building.
 Hong Kong Institute of Vocational Education – Student ID card, attendance, library, printers and computers access.
 The Chinese University of Hong Kong – Student ID card, attendance, library, printers and door access control
 University of Bayreuth – Student ID card and canteen card for paying.
 University of Ibadan, Nigeria – Student ID card and examination verification and attendance.(Solutions Colony Ltd)
 Bowen University, Iwo, Nigeria – Student ID card and examination verification and attendance.(Solutions Colony Ltd)
  Afe Babalola University, Ado-Ekiti, Nigeria – Student ID card and examination verification and attendance.(Solutions Colony Ltd)
  Achievers University, Owo, Nigeria – Student ID card and examination verification and attendance.(Solutions Colony Ltd)
  Adekunle Ajasin University, Akungba, Ondo State, Nigeria – Student ID card and examination Verification and Attendance.(Solutions Colony Ltd)
  Auchi Polytechnic, Auchi, Nigeria – Student ID card and examination verification and attendance.(Solutions Colony Ltd)
 University College Hospital, Ibadan (UCH), Nigeria – Student ID card and staff attendance.(Solutions Colony Ltd)
 Federal University of Technology, Minna, Niger State (FUTM), Nigeria – Student ID card and Examination Verification and Attendance.(Solutions Colony Ltd)
 Benson Idahosa University, Benin City, Edo State (BIU), Nigeria – Student ID card and Examination Verification and Attendance.(Solutions Colony Ltd)
 Federal University of Technology, Akure, Ondo State (FUTA), Nigeria – Student ID card and Examination Verification and Attendance.(Solutions Colony Ltd)
 Covenant University, Nigeria – Student ID card and Examination Verification and Attendance.(Solutions Colony Ltd)
 Lead City University, Nigeria – Student ID card and Examination Verification and Attendance.(Solutions Colony Ltd)
 Hogeschool-Universiteit Brussel, Belgium – Student ID card, canteen card for paying, library and building access.
 Southampton University – Student ID card, library and building access – MIFARE Classic 4K.
 Delft University of Technology, Netherlands – Student/Staff ID card, staff coffee machines, lockers, printers and building access.
 Eindhoven University of Technology, Netherlands – Student/Staff ID card, staff coffee machines, lockers, printers and building access currently (2016) rolling out DESfire EV1.
 Dresden University of Technology, Germany – Building access, canteen card for payment
 Chemnitz University of Technology, Germany – Student ID card
 Leipzig University, Germany – Student ID card, canteen card for payment
 Freiberg University of Mining and Technology, Germany – Student/Stuff ID card, building access, canteen card for payment
 University of Jena, Germany – Student/Staff ID card, building access, canteen card for payment
 University of Würzburg, Germany – Student/Staff ID card, building access, library access and fee payment, canteen card for payment
 Technical University of Denmark, Denmark – Student ID card, building access
 University of Duisburg-Essen, Germany – Student/Staff ID card, library access, canteen card for payment
 Walt Disney World Resort – used for tickets, Disney Dining Plan, and room key access
 University of Northampton – Car park access, building access – MIFARE Classic 1K.
 Assumption University (Thailand), Thailand – Student/Staff ID card, library and computers access, canteen, transportation and parking payment, election verification – MIFARE Classic 4K
 Claude Bernard University Lyon 1 Student ID, access control, library (MIFARE 1K)
 University of Strasbourg Student ID, access control (MIFARE 1K)
Aberystwyth University Student/staff ID, access control, library, copy/print, student discount, payments, building access (MIFARE Classic 4K)
 University of Nottingham – Student ID, access control, library, payments, building access (MIFARE Classic 1K)

See also
 RFID
 Campus card
 Physical security
 NFC
 Smart card

References

Further reading
 Dayal, Geeta, "How they hacked it: The MiFare RFID crack explained; A look at the research behind the chip compromise, Computerworld, 19 March 2008.

External links
 
Comparison Table MIFARE DESFire EV1 / EV2 / EV3
NXP in eGovernment
 24C3 Talk about MIFARE Classic Video of the 24C3 Talk presenting the results of reverse engineering the MIFARE Classic family, raising serious security concerns
 Presentation of 24th Chaos Computer Congress in Berlin Claiming that the MIFARE classic chip is possibly not safe
 Demonstration of an actual attack on MIFARE Classic (a building access control system) by the Radboud University Nijmegen.https://www.mersinliakaryakit.com/ 

Contactless smart cards
Near-field communication
NXP Semiconductors